Crash and Burn is the third studio album by John Foxx and Louis Gordon, released in 2003. The duo did a series of live performances to promote the album, as well as supporting The Human League on their "Very Best Of" tour the same year.

The album was re-released on 29 November 2010 as a double-disc edition with the original tracks remastered and a bonus disc featuring five previously unreleased tracks, namely "Labyrinth Generator", "Storm Warning", "Broadway Submarine", "Dust and Light" (Live) and "Invisible Women V2" (Live), as well as material from 2003's limited edition "Drive EP". 
The accompanying booklet was expanded to twenty pages, and includes all of the lyrics.

A similar double disc edition of Foxx and Gordon's album Sideways was also released on the same date.

The cover image is taken from a close-up used in the RKO film The Spiral Staircase'.

Track listing
All tracks written by John Foxx and Louis Gordon.

Original release
 "Drive" – 6:55
 "Cinema" – 5:09
 "Broken Furniture" – 5:25
 "Crash and Burn" – 4:03
 "Once in a While" – 4:10
 "Sex Video" – 5:00
 "Sidewalking" – 6:12
 "Ultraviolet / Infrared" – 5:14
 "She Robot" – 4:46
 "Dust and Light" – 6:45
 "Ray 1 / Ray 2" – 5:10
 "Smoke" – 7:11

2010 re-release
Disc One, as above

Bonus disc
 "Making Movies"
 "Your Shadow"
 "Underwater Dreamsex"
 "Labyrinth Generator"
 "Broken Furniture (Live from a Room)"
 "UltraViolet / InfraRed (Live from a Room)"
 "Nightlife (Live from a Room)"
 "Storm Warning"
 "Sex Video (Live from a Room)"
 "Broadway Submarine"
 "Dust And Light" (live)
 "Invisible Women V2" (live)

Tracks 1-3 previously available on The Drive EP (2003). Tracks 5-7 & 8 previously available on the album Live from a Room (As Big As a City)'' (2006). Tracks 4, 8, 10-12 previously unavailable.

Personnel
 John Foxx – vocals, synthesisers
 Louis Gordon – synthesizers, engineer
 Roger Lyons – mastering
 Dallas Simpson – re-mastering

References

External links
Drowned in Sound review 
Quietcity.co.uk

John Foxx albums
2003 albums